Hans-Joachim Weise (15 November 1912 – 24 February 1991) was a German competitive sailor and Olympic champion. He won a gold medal in the Star class at the 1936 Summer Olympics in Berlin, together with Peter Bischoff.

References

External links

1912 births
1991 deaths
German male sailors (sport)
Sailors at the 1936 Summer Olympics – Star
Olympic sailors of Germany
Olympic gold medalists for Germany
Olympic medalists in sailing
Star class world champions
World champions in sailing for Germany
Medalists at the 1936 Summer Olympics